Bonava is a residential development company in Northern Europe, born out of the Swedish construction company NCC AB. Bonava develops and sells homes and neighbourhoods to consumers and investors in selected markets in Sweden, Germany, Finland, Denmark, Norway, St. Petersburg, Estonia, Latvia and Lithuania.

The name Bonava comes from the Swedish word "bo" which means living, and "nav" that means hub.

Bonava is listed on Nasdaq Stockholm stock exchange.

History 
 In 1997 NCC acquired SIAB – a company that developed cost-efficient systems for the production of single-family homes and residential houses in Sweden and Germany.  
 In 2009 NCC Housing becomes a separate business area within NCC, today Bonava. The main objective was to form a separate business area to focus on residential development. 
 In 2016 NCC's annual general meeting resolves to distribute Bonava to the shareholders of NCC. 
 June 9, 2016 Bonava is listed on Nasdaq Stockholm stock exchange.

References 

Companies based in Stockholm
Real estate companies of Sweden
Companies listed on Nasdaq Stockholm